The General Artigas Bridge is an international road bridge that crosses the Uruguay River and joins Argentina and Uruguay. It runs between Colón, Entre Ríos Province, Argentina, and Paysandú, Paysandú Department, Uruguay. It is a cantilever bridge with a total length of 2,350 metres (7,709 ft). The main span of the bridge measures 140 metres (460 ft) in length.

The bridge is named after José Gervasio Artigas, the father of Uruguayan independence. It was inaugurated on December 10, 1975.

References
 
 Puentes sobre el Río Uruguay (in Spanish)

See also
 Libertador General San Martín Bridge
 Salto Grande Bridge
 Cellulose plant conflict between Argentina and Uruguay

External links

Bridges in Argentina
Bridges in Uruguay
International bridges
Buildings and structures in Entre Ríos Province
Buildings and structures in Paysandú Department
Bridges completed in 1975
Argentina–Uruguay border crossings
Bridges over the Uruguay River
Cantilever bridges
José Gervasio Artigas